Anatoli Kamugisha is a businessman, entrepreneur, and investor in Uganda, the third-largest economy in the East African Community. He is the managing director and chief executive officer of Akright Projects Limited, a Ugandan real estate development company. He also serves as the president of the Uganda Private Property Developers Association (UPDA). He has been reported to be one of the wealthiest individuals in the country, with an estimated net worth of approximately US$77million as of January 2017.

Background and education
He was born in 1963 in Mitooma District, Western Region. He attended local schools and was admitted to Kyambogo Polytechnic, now part of Kyambogo University, to study for a civil engineering degree. However, he left the university before graduating when he ran out of tuition money.

Work experience
In 1989, at age 26, Kamugisha founded his first company, Kanoblic Group Limited, a real estate construction enterprise. He borrowed money from friends to register his business. He won construction contracts from several reputable firms, including Sugar Corporation of Uganda Limited and the Norwegian Forestry Society.

In 1999, he closed down Kanoblic and started Akright Projects Limited, a company that plans, designs, and constructs organized residential communities (satellite cities) in or near urban centers in Uganda, as an alternative to the mushrooming slum problem in Uganda's cities and towns.

Akright has developed several residential estates including:
 Akright Namanve Housing Estate – Namanve 
 Akright Namugongo Housing Estate – Nsasa
 Akright Kirinnya Housing Estate – Kirinnya
 Akright Lubowa Housing Estate – Lubowa
 Akright City – Bwebajja

In an interview that he gave to the Daily Monitor, in April 2020, Kamugisha explains how borrowing from banks nearly destroyed his business empire. At that time, while most of his troubles were behind him, he was not totally out of the weeds yet.

Kakungulu Housing Estate

In 2002, Akright acquired  of land from the descendants of Badru Kakungulu for the development of the company's largest planned housing estate in the country, Akright Kakungulu Housing Estate, also referred to as Akright City.

See also
 List of wealthiest people in Uganda
 Mitooma
 Entebbe-Kampala Expressway

References

External links
Website of Akright Projects Limited
Real Estate Paying Price for Slow Oil Sector Activity

1963 births
Living people
Ugandan businesspeople
People from Mitooma District
Kyambogo University alumni
Real estate in Uganda
People from Western Region, Uganda
Ugandan businesspeople in real estate